Grčište is a village in the municipality of Valandovo, North Macedonia.

Demographics
According to the 2002 census, the village had a total of 255 inhabitants. Ethnic groups in the village include:

Macedonians 255

People from Grčište 

 Michael Sionidis, Greek leader of makedonomachoi in the Macedonian Struggle

References

External links

Villages in Valandovo Municipality